Three ships in the United States Navy have been named USS Fanning for Nathaniel Fanning.

 The first  was a  launched in 1910 and served in World War I. She served in the United States Coast Guard from 1924 to 1930. She was sold in 1934.
 The second  was a  launched in 1936, served in World War II and decommissioned in 1945.
 The third  was a  launched in 1970 and decommissioned in 1993.  She was sold to Turkey in 1993, decommissioned in 2001, and later scrapped.

United States Navy ship names